Joseph Arame (born 29 August 1948 in Le Moule, Guadeloupe) is a former French sprinter who specialised in the 200 metres.

He was 5 times French 200 metres champion, as well as Indoor 200m champion in 1982.

He was a European cup semi-final winner in the 200 in 1977.

He competed at the 1976 Summer Olympics and 1980 Summer Olympics in the 200m, where both times he reached the semi-final before being eliminated from the event.

References

1948 births
Living people
French male sprinters
Guadeloupean male sprinters
Guadeloupean sportsmen
Olympic athletes of France
Athletes (track and field) at the 1976 Summer Olympics
Athletes (track and field) at the 1980 Summer Olympics
French people of Guadeloupean descent
European Athletics Championships medalists
Mediterranean Games gold medalists for France
Athletes (track and field) at the 1975 Mediterranean Games
Mediterranean Games medalists in athletics